Nevada City Firehouse No. 2 is a historic firehouse located at 420 Broad Street in Nevada City, California. Built in 1860–61, the firehouse was the first built in Nevada City. At the time, Nevada City had two factions competing for public funds for a firehouse: the Broad Street fire company and a group based on Main Street. While the Main Street company officially organized a day before the Broad Street company, the Broad Street firehouse had more private funding and was completed first, and hence Firehouse No. 2 became the first in the city. The firehouse features a two-story portico in front and a Greek Revival cornice.

The firehouse was added to the National Register of Historic Places on May 3, 1974. It is now operated by the Nevada County Historical Society as a museum of local history.

Images

See also
National Register of Historic Places listings in Nevada County, California

References

External links

 Historic Firehouse No. 1 Museum - Nevada County Historical Society
Nevada City Fire Department

Buildings and structures in Nevada City, California
History of Nevada City, California
Fire stations completed in 1860
Fire stations on the National Register of Historic Places in California
National Register of Historic Places in Nevada County, California
Greek Revival architecture in California
Neoclassical architecture in California
Museums in Nevada County, California
Historical society museums in California
1860 establishments in California